The  was an organizational aspect of the establishment of Japanese State Shinto. This system classified Shinto shrines as either official government shrines or "other" shrines. The official shrines were divided into 
Imperial shrines (kampeisha), which are parsed into minor, medium, or major sub-categories; and 
National shrines (kokuheisha), which are similarly categorized as minor, medium, or major.
Some shrines are the "first shrines" called ichinomiya that have the highest rank in their respective provinces of Japan.

The Ise Grand Shrine stood at the top of all shrines and thus was outside the classification.

History
On the fourteenth day of the fifth month of 1871, by decree of the Dajō-kan, the fundamental elements of the modern shrine system were established: a hierarchic ranking of Shinto shrines, with specification of the grades of priest who could officiate at the various levels of shrine. These rankings were set aside in 1946, when such rankings were deemed "State Shinto" by the Occupation Shinto Directive. The Jinja Honcho currently has a slightly different List of Special Shrines (別表神社, beppyo jinja).

Kan-sha
The  or "official government shrines" had two subdivisions, Kanpei-sha or "government shrines" and Kokuhei-sha or "national shrines".

Kanpei-sha
In 1871, the  identified the hierarchy of government-supported shrines most closely associated with the imperial family. These shrines venerated by the imperial family. This category encompasses those sanctuaries enshrining emperors, imperial family members, or meritorious retainers of the Imperial family.

Imperial shrines, 1st rank
The most highly ranked Imperial shrines or  encompassed 67 sanctuaries.

Imperial shrines, 2nd rank
The mid-range of ranked Imperial shrines or  included 23 sanctuaries.

Imperial shrines, 3rd rank

Other Imperial shrines

Kokuhei-sha
The  identified the hierarchy of government-supported shrines with national significance. The kokuheisha enshrined kami considered beneficial to more local areas.

National shrines, 1st rank

National shrines, 2nd rank
The mid-range of ranked, nationally significant shrines or  encompassed 47 sanctuaries.

National shrines, 3rd rank
The lowest ranked, nationally significant shrines or  includes 50 sanctuaries.

"Min-sha"
These lower-ranking shrines were initially subdivided by the proclamation of the fourteenth day of the fifth month of 1871 into four main ranks, "Metropolitan", "Clan" or "Domain", "Prefectural", and "District" shrines. By far the largest number of shrines fell below the rank of District shrine.

Metropolitan shrines

Clan or Domain shrines
Due to the abolition of the han system, no shrines were ever placed in this category.

Prefectural shrines

District shrine

Village shrines

Hokora or Ungraded shrines

Statistics
New shrines were established and existing shrines promoted to higher ranks at various dates, but a 1903 snapshot of the 193,297 shrines in existence at that time saw the following:

Kan-sha
Imperial shrines: 95
National shrines: 75
"Min-sha"
Metropolitan and prefectural shrines: 571
District shrines: 3,476
Village shrines: 52,133
Ungraded shrines: 136,947

See also
 List of Shinto shrines
 Twenty-Two Shrines
 Setsumatsusha

Notes

References

 Breen, John and Mark Teeuwen. (2000).  Shinto in History: Ways of the Kami. Honolulu: University of Hawaii Press. 
 Ponsonby-Fane, Richard. (1959).  The Imperial House of Japan. Kyoto: Ponsonby Memorial Society. OCLC 194887
 ___. (1962).  Studies in Shinto and Shrines. Kyoto: Ponsonby Memorial Society. OCLC 399449
 ___. (1963).  The Viciissitudes of Shinto. Kyoto: Ponsonby Memorial Society.  

1871 establishments in Japan
Empire of Japan
1945 disestablishments in Japan
Shinto shrines in Japan
Modern system of ranked Shinto shrines